Duckmaloi is a rural locality in the local government area (LGA) of Oberon in the Central West region of New South Wales. The 2016 census recorded a population of 49 for the state suburb of Duckmaloi.

History 

Elements of Jenolan Caves#History may apply to this locality.

Geography
The Duckmaloi River forms much of the eastern boundary, and the Fish River flows through from south-west to north-east where it is joined by the Duckmaloi River and forms the north-eastern boundary.

Road infrastructure
Duckmaloi Road provides access to the locality from Oberon to the west and from Hampton to the east.

References

Towns in New South Wales
Oberon Council